Márcio Roberto dos Santos (born 15 September 1969), commonly known as Márcio Santos, is a former association footballer, who played as a defender.

Club career
Santos was born in São Paulo, and played for several clubs throughout his career, such as Internacional, Fiorentina, Ajax and São Paulo as a centre-back. He won the 1991 Campeonato Gaúcho with Internacional, the 1995–96 Eredivisie with Ajax, and Paulista Championship with São Paulo.

International career
At international level, he was a member of the Brazil national football team that won the 1994 FIFA World Cup, in which he scored one goal in the group stages, against Cameroon. He missed his penalty in the shootout in the final against Italy, but Brazil went on to win regardless. He was named to the team of the tournament for his performances. He played 43 games for Brazil between 1990 and 1997, scoring five goals. He also took part at two Copa América tournaments, reaching the final in 1991, and winning the tournament in 1997.

Honours

Club
Internacional
Campeonato Gaúcho: 1991

Ajax
Eredivisie: 1995–96

São Paulo
Paulista Championship: 1998

International
Brazil
Copa América: 1997; Runner-up 1991
FIFA World Cup: 1994
Umbro Cup: 1995
Tournoi de France: Runner-up 1997

Individual
Bola de Prata: 1991
Placar Team of the Year: 1991
1994 FIFA World Cup Team of the Tournament
FIFA XI (Reserve): 2001

References

1969 births
Living people
Brazilian footballers
Grêmio Esportivo Novorizontino players
Sport Club Internacional players
Botafogo de Futebol e Regatas players
FC Girondins de Bordeaux players
ACF Fiorentina players
AFC Ajax players
São Paulo FC players
Santos FC players
Sociedade Esportiva do Gama players
Shandong Taishan F.C. players
Club Bolívar players
Joinville Esporte Clube players
Associação Atlética Portuguesa (Santos) players
Campeonato Brasileiro Série A players
Ligue 1 players
Serie A players
Eredivisie players
Brazil international footballers
1994 FIFA World Cup players
FIFA World Cup-winning players
Brazilian expatriate footballers
Expatriate footballers in France
Brazilian expatriate sportspeople in France
Expatriate footballers in Italy
Brazilian expatriate sportspeople in Italy
Expatriate footballers in the Netherlands
Brazilian expatriate sportspeople in the Netherlands
Expatriate footballers in China
Brazilian expatriate sportspeople in China
Expatriate footballers in Bolivia
Brazilian expatriate sportspeople in Bolivia
Liga I players
Paulista Futebol Clube players
1991 Copa América players
1997 Copa América players
Copa América-winning players
Association football defenders
Footballers from São Paulo